Raymond Barbeau (June 27, 1930 – March 5, 1992) was a teacher, essayist, literary critic, political figure and naturopath. He was one of the early militants of the contemporary independence movement of Quebec.

Barbeau was born in Montreal in 1930 and earned in 1955 a doctorate from the Université de Paris (La Sorbonne). In 1957, he founded the Alliance laurentienne, one of the first 20th century organizations in favour of an independent Quebec republic, and founded its official organ called Laurentie. He created the movement Les fils du Québec (French for "The Sons of Quebec") in 1970. 

He died in Montreal in 1992.

Bibliography 
J'ai choisi l'indépendance (1961)
Le Québec est-il une colonie ? (1962)
La libération économique du Québec (1963)
Le Québec bientôt unilingue? (1965)
Oui au référendum. Procès de la Confédération (1977)
Le Québec souverain, un pays normal (1978)

See also 
Quebec sovereignty movement
Quebec nationalism
Politics of Quebec

References 
"Barbeau (Raymond)" at La Mémoire du Québec
 Jean-Marc Brunet. Le prophète solitaire. Raymond Barbeau et son époque Montréal : Ordre naturiste social de Saint-Marc l’Évangéliste Inc., 2000. 582 pages
 Xavier Gélinas. "Compte-rendu de Le prophète solitaire. Raymond Barbeau et son époque", in Mens, Revue d'histoire intellectuelle de l'Amérique française, Volume III, numéro 2 (spring 2003)
 Raymond Barbeau et l'Alliance laurentienne : les ultras de l'indépendantisme québécois, M.A. [Histoire], Université de Montréal, 1997, vii-219 p.

University of Paris alumni
Political consultants from Quebec
Writers from Montreal
1930 births
1992 deaths
Canadian non-fiction writers in French
Canadian expatriates in France
Canadian male non-fiction writers
French Quebecers
Naturopaths